Cryptandra lanosiflora is a species of flowering plant in the family Rhamnaceae and is endemic to eastern Australia. It is a shrub with many branches, linear leaves, and hairy, white tube-shaped flowers.

Description
The edges of the leaves are rolled under, the upper surface more or less glabrous, the lower surface white, but usually obscured.

Taxonomy and naming
Cryptandra lanosiflora was first formally described in 1862 by Ferdinand von Mueller in Fragmenta Phytographiae Australiae from specimens collected by Hermann Beckler.

Distribution and habitat
This cryptandra grows in heath and open forest in exposed, rocky place from Stanthorpe in south-eastern Queensland to Werrikimbe National Park and the Liverpool Range in New South Wales.

References

lanosiflora
Rosales of Australia
Flora of Queensland
Flora of New South Wales
Plants described in 1862
Taxa named by Ferdinand von Mueller